Hamdan Ismael Mohammed Al-Kamali (born 2 May 1989) is an Emirati footballer, currently playing as a central defender for Shabab Al-Ahli and the UAE national team. He was part of the United Arab Emirates football team at the 2012 Summer Olympics.

Club career

Al Wahda
Al Kamali began his career with Al Wahda at the age of seven, where he played in the club's youth teams, a physical education teacher at his school was impressed with his talent, who took him to the Al Wahda club in Bani Yas, where he attracted the attention of the Egyptian coach Abdel Fattah coach of the youth teams at that time, Al Wahda signed him after selection by the coach Abdel Fattah. In the 2006–07 season, Al Kamali become a first team player. He made his official debut for the first-team on 12 November 2006 in a 0–1 loss to Al Jazira at the Vice Presidents Cup, where he was sent off after a foul on Toni.

Al Kamali was listed as one of the best 100 young players in the world by the respected Spanish football Magazine 'Don Balon'. He also attracted interest from Lyon; only to have Al Wahda reject the French team's bid for him.

Olympique Lyonnais
After a long time of negotiations he was officially introduced by the Lyon president Jean-Michel Aulas on 28 January 2012, on a 6-month loan with the option of permanent switch.

Career statistics

Club

International

International goals
Scores and results list the United Arab Emirates' goal tally first.

Honours

Club
Al Wahda
Pro-League: 1
 2009–10

UAE
AFC U-19 Championship: 1
 2008
Under 23 Gulf Cup of Nations: 1
 2010
Asian Games Silver Medal: 1
 2010
Gulf Cup of Nations: 1
 2013
AFC Asian Cup third place: 1
 2015

References

External links
  
 
 
 
 

1989 births
Living people
2011 AFC Asian Cup players
Al Wahda FC players
Shabab Al-Ahli Club players
Association football defenders
Expatriate footballers in France
Olympique Lyonnais players
People from Abu Dhabi
Emirati footballers
Emirati expatriate footballers
Footballers at the 2012 Summer Olympics
2015 AFC Asian Cup players
Olympic footballers of the United Arab Emirates
United Arab Emirates international footballers
Asian Games medalists in football
Footballers at the 2010 Asian Games
Asian Games silver medalists for the United Arab Emirates
UAE Pro League players
Emirati expatriate sportspeople in France
Medalists at the 2010 Asian Games